is a train station on the Osaka Metro Imazatosuji Line in Higashiyodogawa-ku, Osaka, Japan. It is the terminus of the line and the northernmost subway station in the city of Osaka.

Station layout
There is an island platform with two tracks underground. The platform is fenced with platform screen doors.

External links
Itakano Station (Osaka Metro)

Higashiyodogawa-ku, Osaka
Railway stations in Osaka
Railway stations in Japan opened in 2006
Osaka Metro stations